The  Russian locomotive class A was a series of Russian steam locomotives from the early 20th Century, among the most powerful produced in the country at that time, with a top speed of 115 kilometers per hour. 

One example, shown here, Ab type, with a Schmidt superheater, with the number between the couplers indicates Ab 132, produced at the Briansk locomotive factory in 1909.

References

Steam locomotives of the Russian Empire